Clarksville is an unincorporated community in Calhoun County, Florida, United States. Clarksville has a post office with ZIP code 32430.

References

Unincorporated communities in Calhoun County, Florida
Unincorporated communities in Florida